Vila Velha may refer to:

 Vila Velha, a coastal city in Espírito Santo, Brazil
 Vila Velha de Ródão, a Portuguese town
 Vila Velha do Cassiporé, a village in Amapá, Brazil
 Battle of Vila Velha, a 1762 battle at Vila Velha de Ródão
 Pereira (Bahia), a lost colony in Salvador, Bahia, Brazil later known as Vila Velha
 Vila Velha State Park, a Park in Paraná, Brazil
 Vila Velha Theater, a theater in Salvador, Bahia, Brazil